Peter S. Carmichael (born February 13, 1966) is an American historian at Gettysburg College who serves as Robert C. Fluhrer Professor of Civil War Studies and Director of the Civil War Institute at Gettysburg College. His research and teaching is focused on the American Civil War, the American South, and public history.

Early life and education
Carmichael was born February 13, 1966. He received his B.A. from Indiana University–Purdue University Indianapolis in 1988 and completed his graduate work under Gary Gallagher at The Pennsylvania State University, where he received his PhD in 1996.

Career
Carmichael began his academic career at Western Carolina University in 1997. He was the first Scholar-in-Residence at Gettysburg National Military Park in 1999. He went on to teach at the University of North Carolina, Greensboro and West Virginia University before coming to Gettysburg College as Robert C. Fluhrer Professor of Civil War Studies and Director of the Civil War Institute at Gettysburg College in 2010.

Since taking charge of the Civil War Institute, Carmichael has sought to create more intimate environments during the Institute's annual summer conference, attended by over 200 people each year, to allow scholars to work with the public in smaller settings.

Carmichael also serves on the Board of Directors and the Historians' Council of the Gettysburg Foundation, the non-profit partner of Gettysburg National Military Park. He was recently reappointed as a Distinguished Lecturer for the Organization of American Historians for 2017-2018.

He is co-editor of the Civil War America series from the University of North Carolina Press.

Bibliography
The Purcell, Crenshaw & Letcher Artillery. Lynchburg:  H. E. Howard, Inc., 1991.
Lee's Young Artillerist: William R.J. Pegram. Charlottesville: University of Virginia Press, 1995.
Audacity Personified: The Generalship of Robert E. Lee (editor). Baton Rouge:  Louisiana State University Press, 2004.
The Last Generation: Young Virginians in Peace, War, and Reunion. Chapel Hill: University of North Carolina Press, 2009.
The War for the Common Soldier: How Men Thought, Fought, and Survived in Civil War Armies. Chapel Hill: The University of North Carolina Press, 2018.

References

External links
Carmichael at the Civil War Institute

Gettysburg College faculty
Indiana University–Purdue University Indianapolis alumni
Pennsylvania State University alumni
21st-century American historians
21st-century American male writers
1966 births
Living people
20th-century American historians
20th-century American male writers
Historians of the American Civil War
American male non-fiction writers